Michael Thomas Kosman (November 26, 1917 – December 10, 2002) was a Major League Baseball player. Kosman played in one game in the 1944 season with the Cincinnati Reds. He had no at-bats in the game.

Kosman was born in Hamtramck, Michigan and died in Lafayette, Indiana.

External links
Baseball-Reference page

1917 births
2002 deaths
Cincinnati Reds players
Baseball players from Michigan
Major League Baseball second basemen
Birmingham Barons players
Knoxville Smokies players
Mobile Bears players
Indiana University alumni